Conservation International (CI) is an American nonprofit environmental organization headquartered in Crystal City, Arlington, Virginia.

CI's work focuses on science, policy and partnership with businesses, governments and communities. The organization employs nearly 1,000 people and works with more than 2,000 partners in 29 countries. CI has helped support 1,200 protected areas and interventions across 77 countries, protecting more than 6 million square kilometers (2.3 million square miles) of land and sea.

History

Conservation International was founded in 1987 with the goal of protecting nature for the benefit of people.

In 1989, CI formally committed to the protection of biodiversity hotspots, ultimately identifying 36 such hotspots around the world and contributing to their protection. The model of protecting hotspots became a key way for organizations to do conservation work.

On July 1, 2017, Peter Seligmann stepped down as CEO of CI and a new executive team made up of senior CI leadership was announced. Conservation scientist M. Sanjayan was named chief executive officer. Sebastian Troeng is executive vice president of conservation partnerships, and Daniela Raik is executive vice president of field programs. Peter Seligmann remains chairman of the board.

Growth and mission shift
The organization's leadership grew to believe that CI's focus on biodiversity conservation was inadequate to protect nature and those who depended on it. CI updated its mission in 2008 to focus explicitly on the connections between human well-being and natural ecosystems. Since then, the organization has expanded its work with a stronger focus on marine conservation; scientific research; conservation finance; and partnerships with governments, corporations and Indigenous and local communities. 

In FY2020, CI's expenses totaled more than US$154 million.

CI receives high ratings from philanthropic watchdog organizations, with an A rating from Charity Watch. Charity Navigator awarded CI a 100% score for accountability and transparency.

Approach to conservation

The foundation of CI's work is "science, partnership and field demonstration." The organization has scientists, policy workers and other conservationists on the ground in nearly 30 countries. It also relies heavily on thousands of local partners.

CI focuses on four strategic priorities: protecting nature for climate; ocean conservation at scale; promoting nature-based economic development; and innovation in science and finance.

CI works with governments, universities, NGOs and the private sector with the aim of replicating its successes on a larger scale. By showing how conservation can work at all scales, CI aims to make the protection of nature a key consideration in economic development decisions around the world. For example, through its partnerships with governments and coastal communities, CI has helped to protect more than 5 million square kilometers (13 million square miles) of ocean area while also improving the management of sustainable fisheries and restoring mangroves, which mitigate the impacts of climate change. The Blue Nature Alliance, a global initiative launched by CI and partners in 2020, aims to protect an additional 18 million square kilometers (7 million square miles) of ocean area.

The organization has been active in United Nations discussions on issues such as climate change and biodiversity, and its scientists present at international conferences and workshops. On a per-paper basis, Conservation International's scientific output research is among the most influential of any conservation organization in the U.S., and ahead of top research universities and other NGOs. To date, Conservation International has published more than 1,100 peer-reviewed articles, many in leading journals like Science, Nature, and the Proceedings of the National Academy of Sciences. 

Conservation International works in partnership with some of the world's most prominent companies to reduce their impact on the environment and support the protection of nature. CI is working with Starbucks, Walmart, P&G and Apple, among others. In 2020, CI began a new partnership with Mastercard and WRI to support the Priceless Planet Coalition in its goal to restore 100 million trees in critical forests around the world.

Criticism
CI has been criticized for links to companies such as BP, Cargill, Chevron, Monsanto and Shell. CI has defended its work with the private sector, arguing that change requires working with corporations that have large environmental impacts.

A 2008 article in The Nation claimed that the organization had attracted $6 million for marine conservation in Papua New Guinea, but that the funds were used for "little more than plush offices and first class travel." CI has touted its operations in Papua New Guinea, claiming that they have contributed to new scientific discoveries and the establishment of new protected areas. As of 2016, CI no longer works directly in Papua New Guinea.

In 2011, Conservation International was targeted by a group of reporters from Don't Panic TV who posed as an American company and asked if the charity could "raise [their] green profile." Options outlined by the representative of Conservation International (CI) included assisting with the company's green PR efforts, membership of a business forum in return for a fee, and sponsorship packages where the company could potentially invest money in return for being associated with conservation activities. Conservation International agreed to help the company find an "endangered species mascot". Film footage shows the Conservation International employee suggesting a vulture and North African birds of prey as a possible endangered species mascot for the company. CI contends that these recordings were heavily edited to remove elements that would have cast CI in a more favorable light, while using other parts of the video out of context to paint an inaccurate and incomplete picture of CI's work with the private sector.

In May and June 2013, Survival International reported that an indigenous Bushman tribe in Botswana was threatened with eviction from their ancestral land in order to create a wildlife corridor known as the Western Kgalagadi Conservation Corridor. A Botswana government representative denied this. A May press release from CI said, "Contrary to recent reports, Conservation International (CI) has not been involved in the implementation of conservation corridors in Botswana since 2011," and asserted that CI had always supported the San Bushmen and their rights.

Leadership

Executives 

CEO: M. Sanjayan, Ph.D.
 Executive Vice President of Conservation Partnerships: Sebastian Troeng, Ph.D.
 Executive Vice President of Field Programs: Daniela Raik, Ph.D.
Chairman of the Board: Peter Seligmann
 Chairman of the Executive Committee: Wesley G. Bush
 Vice Chair: Harrison Ford
 Emeritus:
 Adam Albright
 Edward Norton
 Ray R. Thurston

Leadership Council 

 Chairperson: Katie Vogelheim
 Vice Chairperson: Daniel A. Shaw
 Members: 
 Lisa Anderson
 Sarah E. Johnson
 Nancy Morgan Ritter
 Jeff Rosenthal

Bibliography
 Paint It Wild: Paint & See Activity Book (Discover The Rainforest, Vol. 1) (1991), introduction by Mike Roberts and Russell Mittermeier, written by Gad Meiron and Randall Stone, illustrated by Donna Reynolds and Tim Racer
 Sticker Safari: Sticker And Activity Book (Discover The Rainforest, Vol. 2) (1991), introduction by Mike Roberts and Russell Mittermeier, written by Gad Meiron and Randall Stone, illustrated by Donna Reynolds and Tim Racer
 Wonders In The Wild: Activity Book (Discover The Rainforest, Vol. 3) (1991), introduction by Mike Roberts and Russell Mittermeier, written by Gad Meiron and Randall Stone, illustrated by Donna Reynolds and Tim Racer
 Ronald McDonald and the Jewel of the Amazon Kingdom: Storybook (Discover The Rainforest, Vol. 4) (1991), introduction by Mike Roberts and Russell Mittermeier, written by Gad Meiron and Randall Stone, illustrated by Donna Reynolds and Tim Racer

References

External links
Conservation International - Official site
Global Symposium 2006 Madagascar
Defying Ocean's End, A Conservation International led Agenda for Action in ocean conservation
Charity Navigator Evaluation by America's premier independent charity evaluator
Youtube video Al Gore explaining the need for more action on climate change
Deep Sea Conservation Coalition - A union of 60+ international organizations working towards biodiversity conservation on the high seas.
Reserva Ecologica Pachijal - A Conservation effort in the Cloudforest of Mindo-Ecuador

International environmental organizations
Forest conservation organizations
International forestry organizations
Nature conservation organizations based in the United States
Environmental organizations based in Virginia
Educational organizations based in the United States
Learned societies of the United States
Organizations based in Arlington County, Virginia
Environmental organizations established in 1987
Scientific organizations established in 1987
1987 establishments in Virginia